Francisco de Vitoria University is a private university located in Pozuelo de Alarcón, in the Community of Madrid, Spain. It is a Roman Catholic institution run by the Legion of Christ. It is named after Francisco de Vitoria ( – 1546), a Spanish philosopher, theologian, and jurist.

External links
 Universidad Francisco de Vitoria Main Website

Francisco de Vitoria University
Anahuac universities
Catholic universities and colleges in Spain
Educational institutions established in 1993
1993 establishments in Spain
Buildings and structures in Pozuelo de Alarcón